The 1987 UCLA Bruins football team was an American football team that represented the University of California, Los Angeles during the 1987 NCAA Division I-A football season.  In their 12th year under head coach Terry Donahue, the Bruins compiled a 10–2 record (7–1 Pac-10), finished in a tie for first place in the Pacific-10 Conference, and were ranked #9 in the final AP Poll. The team's sole losses were against #2-ranked Nebraska (33-42) and USC (13-17).  The Bruins went on to defeat Florida in the 1987 Aloha Bowl.

UCLA's offensive leaders in 1987 were quarterback Troy Aikman with 2,527 passing yards, running back Gaston Green with 1,098 rushing yards, and wide receiver Flipper Anderson with 903 receiving yards.

Schedule

Roster

Game summaries

at Nebraska

Oregon

Washington

at USC

Florida (Aloha Bowl)

1988 NFL Draft
The following players were drafted into professional football following the season.

References

UCLA
UCLA Bruins football seasons
Pac-12 Conference football champion seasons
Aloha Bowl champion seasons
UCLA Bruins football